Tu Maza Jeev ( Tū Mājhā Jīv) is a 2009 East Indian language film directed by Ranjan Singh and produced by Nelson Patel. It features Shalmali Kholgade and Rutwig Vaidya in the lead roles.

Tu Maza Jeev  was released on 1 May 2009 in order to coincide with Maharashtra Day and had 2,500 viewers in its first week of release. This audience grew by 65% the following week.

References

External links 
 

2000s Marathi-language films
2009 films